The Advance Bank was an Australian bank that existed from 1985 until 1997, when it merged with St George Bank. It is not related to Advance Bank AG of Germany (which was shut down by Allianz in 2003).

It was established as the NSW Permanent Building & Investment Society in 1939.

In 1982, it established a funds management division, Advance Asset Management, which is now a specialist asset management business within Westpac. "Its focus is on asset allocation and risk management, implemented through a multi-manager process, providing investment opportunities across a range of asset classes, including shares, property, fixed interest and cash."

The building society was demutualised in 1985 and became known as the Advance Bank.

In 1995, Advance Bank acquired the State Bank of South Australia, which it continued to run as a separate business unit as BankSA.

Advance Bank (and its BankSA subsidiary) was taken over in 1997 by St George Bank, itself another former building society. St George Bank was then taken over by Westpac in 2008.

References

Banks established in 1985
Banks disestablished in 1997
Defunct banks of Australia
Mutual savings banks in Australia
1939 establishments in Australia
1985 disestablishments in Australia